Leung Ka-lau (born 1962) is a former member of the Legislative Council of Hong Kong (Functional constituency, medical). He is the first public hospital doctor to be elected as a legislator. He beat pan-democrat Kwok Ka-ki for the seat in the 2008 Hong Kong legislative election. Dr. Leung is a surgeon specialising in General Surgery in the Prince of Wales Hospital in Shatin.

Leung Ka-lau, who has represented the medical functional constituency since 2008, has voted with moderate mindset on various issues. However, he is widely considered a pro-Beijing politician.

Government doctors' pay claim 
In 2002, Leung was named 1st plaintiff in a suit brought by 165 public hospital doctors against the Hospital Authority for remuneration for working on rest days and public holidays and for overtime work. The Court of First Instance ruled they be compensated for loss of rest days and public holidays but dismissed their overtime claim. The Hospital Authority then offered compensation of HK$600 million to the 4,000 doctors affected.

References

External links
Official website of Hon. Leung Ka Lau

1962 births
Living people
Alumni of the Chinese University of Hong Kong
Alumni of the University of Edinburgh
Hong Kong medical doctors
People from Zhaoqing
HK LegCo Members 2008–2012
HK LegCo Members 2012–2016
Members of the Election Committee of Hong Kong, 2007–2012
Members of the Election Committee of Hong Kong, 2017–2021